The T 53 class were the second group of destroyers built for the French Navy after World War II. These ships were a modified version of the s. The main difference with the preceding ships was the provision of improved air warning and tracking radars as well as an anti-submarine mortar. The ships were built between 1957 and 1958 and were decommissioned in the late 1970s or early 1980s. A single modified ship La Galissonnière was built as a trials ship for a new generation of French weapons. This ship was designated as the T 56 class.

Modifications
In 1972–73 two of the class were substantially modified:
 Duperré was completely rearmed with a Model 1968  main gun, four Exocet MM38 missiles, two quadruple L5 torpedo launchers, and two 20 mm AA cannon. She was also fitted with a helipad to carry a Lynx WG13 helicopter.
 Forbin had her forward 57 mm turret removed, and her aft 127 mm turret was replaced by a helipad. She was then principally used as a naval aviation training ship alongside the helicopter cruiser .

La Galissonnière
La Galissonnière differed slightly in specification from the rest of the class as she was built specifically to test the Malafon anti-submarine missile.
 Length : 
 Beam : 
 Draught : 
 Complement: 272
 2 × Model 1953  guns (1×2)
 1 ×  Malafon anti-submarine missile launcher (13 missiles)
 6 ×   torpedo tubes (2×3)
 1 × quadruple  anti-submarine mortar
 2 × 20 mm AA cannon
 1 × Alouette II or Alouette III helicopter

Ships

See also
List of Escorteurs of the French Navy

References

Bibliography
 Conway's All the World's Fighting Ships 1947–1995

External links
 ex-Duperre at anchorage in Brest, France 2004

 
Destroyer classes
Cold War naval ships of France
Ship classes of the French Navy